Patrick Hume, 1st Earl of Marchmont (13 January 16412 August 1724), known as Sir Patrick Hume, 2nd Baronet from 1648 to 1690 and as Lord Polwarth from 1690 to 1697, was a Scottish statesman. His grandfather was the poet and courtier Sir Patrick Hume of Polwarth and Redbraes who died in 1609.

Life
Born at Polwarth, Berwickshire, he was raised as a strict Presbyterian, and after a term of law study at Paris he became a member of the Scottish parliament in 1665 as shire commissioner for Berwickshire, where he at once took a foremost place as defender of the Covenanters.  He went so far as to bring imprisonment upon himself, and on being freed was suspected of complication in the Rye House Plot, so that he was forced to remain in hiding until he could escape in disguise to the Netherlands.  

There, he joined  Archibald Campbell, 9th Earl of Argyll and embarked with him on the unsuccessful 1685 expedition to Scotland.  Hume became a refugee with a price set upon his head; but he once more escaped abroad and lived at Utrecht under the name "Dr. Wallace," professing to be a Scottish surgeon. He returned with William of Orange at the Revolution of 1688, and once again joined the Scottish parliament as the commissioner for Berwickshire until becoming Lord Polwarth in 1690.

With his estates restored and now a Scottish peer, he was made Lord Chancellor in 1696 and Earl of Marchmont in 1697, although when Anne came to the throne in 1702 he lost his chancellorship.  

He strenuously opposed in Parliament the claims of the Old Pretender to the crown and voted for the union of Scotland with England, though he was not above the suspicion of having received a reward for so doing. Too dogmatic to be popular, he did not hold office in Great Britain until the reign of George I, when he was given some minor charges, but shortly afterwards retired. Hume was an active freemason, he belonged to St Mary's Lodge, Edinburgh since 1667.

Family
At least six of his children died in infancy and were buried in the Foulis tomb in Greyfriars Kirkyard. His son, Sir Andrew Hume, later Lord Kimmerghame, served as a commissioner in parliament for Kirkcudbright.

He was great-nephew to both Patrick Hume of Polwarth and Rev Alexander Hume.

His eldest daughter, Grisell Hume (later Lady Grisell Baillie) wrote the popular 17th century song "Werna my Heart Licht I Wad Dee" (Were not My Heart Light I would Die). Another daughter, Julian, married Charles Billingham, an English soldier.

Arms

References

Sources

Lord chancellors of Scotland
Shire Commissioners to the Parliament of Scotland
Earls of Marchmont
Peers of Scotland created by William II
Scottish Presbyterians
1641 births
1724 deaths
Lords High Commissioner to the General Assembly of the Church of Scotland
People of the Rye House Plot
People from Berwickshire
Burials at the Canongate Kirkyard
17th-century Scottish politicians
18th-century British politicians
University of Paris alumni
Covenanters
Scottish Jacobites
Scottish Freemasons
Lords High Commissioner to the Parliament of Scotland
Members of the Convention of the Estates of Scotland 1665
Members of the Convention of the Estates of Scotland 1667
Members of the Parliament of Scotland 1669–1674
Members of the Convention of the Estates of Scotland 1689
Members of the Parliament of Scotland 1689–1702
Commissioners of the Treasury of Scotland
Senators of the College of Justice
Extraordinary Lords of Session